Major-General John Owen Carpenter  (20 June 1894 − 28 February 1967) was a senior British Army officer.

Military career
Carpenter was commissioned into the East Surrey Regiment and saw action in the First World War for which he was awarded the Military Cross. He went on to become Assistant Commandant of the Small Arms School in India in 1932. He served in the Second World War as commander of 214th Independent Brigade in February 1941, as General Officer Commanding 61st Infantry Division from September 1942 and as General Officer Commanding Catterick Area from 1943 until he retired in 1946.

He was appointed a Commander of the Order of the British Empire in the 1942 Birthday Honours.

References

Bibliography

External links
Generals of World War II

1894 births
1967 deaths
British Army personnel of World War I
British Army major generals
British Army generals of World War II
East Surrey Regiment officers
Commanders of the Order of the British Empire
Recipients of the Military Cross